"Pilot" is the first episode of the first season of the television series Malcolm in the Middle. It originally aired on Fox on January 9, 2000. It was the first episode written by Linwood Boomer and was directed by Todd Holland. In the episode, the six primary characters are introduced, Malcolm, Lois, Hal, Reese, Dewey, and Francis (who is currently at military school), and Malcolm's struggles and fears to be placed in the accelerated learning class ('Krelboynes') even though he has an IQ of 165. Airing as a midseason replacement for Futurama, the episode gained a large viewer base, with ratings of 23 million.

Plot
Brothers Malcolm (Frankie Muniz), Reese (Justin Berfield), and Dewey (Erik Per Sullivan) wake up to a typical school morning - the three siblings fighting over waffles at breakfast and their mother Lois (Jane Kaczmarek) carelessly shaving their father Hal's (Bryan Cranston) excessive body hair. While walking to school, Malcolm and Dewey lay eyes upon the school bully, Dave Spath (Vincent Berry). In class, Malcolm's teacher (Merrin Dungey) comments on his talent for painting; in an act of jealousy, Spath pours red paint on his chair. Malcolm sits in the paint just before being called to see the school psychologist, Caroline Miller (Catherine Lloyd Burns), and is ridiculed by everyone he passes on the way to her office. Caroline states her intentions to run some tests on Malcolm, and does so by holding up a tampered picture with several mistakes in it. Still annoyed at Spath's prank, Malcolm launches into a tirade, angrily yet correctly naming all the mistakes before yelling about the paint on his clothes. In an excited manner, Caroline stops her watch that she was using to time him.

After school, Malcolm arrives for a "play-date" with Stevie Kenarban (Craig Lamar Traylor). Realizing that Stevie's mother Kitty Kenarban (Dungey) is very protective, Malcolm concludes there is nothing to do until Stevie reveals he has a closet full of comics. The discovery instantly sparks a friendship. The next day, a topless Lois, after lecturing Francis (Christopher Kennedy Masterson) about smoking, is met by Caroline, who wishes to speak to her. After misconstruing that she wants to put Malcolm in a special class for intellectually disabled children, Lois is informed (off-camera) of Malcolm's academic capabilities. At the dinner table, Lois persuades a reluctant Malcolm to join the accelerated learning class ("the Krelboynes"), stating that it is important for him to join, as he will no doubt have a better future as a result.

The next day, Malcolm's teacher informs his non-interested class about how he is a success, and Malcolm finds himself surrounded by geniuses only a short while later. After accidentally insulting Stevie, Malcolm tries to make amends with him but Spath once again picks on Malcolm. This causes Malcolm to lose his temper and begins to insult Spath, telling him he's worthless. As the two break into a fight, Malcolm ducks as Spath's fist accidentally and softly brushes against the cheek of Stevie's face. Stevie overhears Spath's friends talking and then falls over in his wheelchair, turning the crowd against Spath despite his claim that it was an accident. As Malcolm and Stevie smile at one another, Malcolm realizes there are things worse than being a Krelboyne.

Afterwards, Malcolm then mentions what happens to Spath afterwards and debates whether he feels sorry for him or not. Dewey, who is under an overturned trash can on which Malcolm is sitting, yells to Malcolm to let him out.

Production
Kaczmarek said on the August 28, 2021 episode of Wait Wait... Don't Tell Me! that Cranston did not have a hairy back, so for the first scene, yak hair was used, along with a body double chosen from Teamsters who worked on the show. According to series creator Linwood Boomer, several jokes in the episode were written by his ex-wife,  including part of Lois’s speech. The boys who played Richard and Spath auditioned for Malcolm and Reese respectively.  Shooting the scene where Malcolm stands up to Spath was said to be difficult, as Todd Holland had to keep over a hundred 11-year-old kids focused.

The original version of the pilot was about 25 minutes, but was shortened to 22 minutes for TV, including overlaying the credits over the last scene instead of being separate, and shortening some scenes like the boys talking about Francis being in Alabama. 

The episode originally was going to end with Malcolm tying a skateboard to the back of his dad’s car, with the car’s engine starting as it cuts to black. The network didn’t want the stunt to be replicated, so even though Boomer thought it was really funny, he obliged to what the network wanted.  The pilot episode was filmed in 1999.

Accolades
This episode won multiple awards, including two Primetime Emmy Awards for Outstanding Directing and Writing for a Comedy Series for Todd Holland and Linwood Boomer, respectively, in 2000. Leading on from this, Holland was nominated for the Directors Guild of America Award for Outstanding Directing – Comedy Series in 2001.

References

2000 American television episodes
Malcolm in the Middle episodes
Malcolm in the Middle
Emmy Award-winning episodes